The 2013 College Basketball Invitational (CBI) was a single-elimination tournament of 16 National Collegiate Athletic Association (NCAA) Division I teams that did not participate in the NCAA Tournament or the NIT. The opening games were held on Tuesday, March 19. A best-of-three championship series between the final two teams was held on April 1, April 3, and April 5.

Participants
North Dakota State and College of Charleston each had 24 wins going into this tournament, which is the most since Akron and IUPUI in 2009 (24 wins each). Texas and Purdue were teams invited despite having records under .500.

Schedule

Bracket

''Home teams listed second.
* Denotes overtime period.

References

College Basketball Invitational
College Basketball Invitational